Blavia caliginosa is a moth of the subfamily Arctiinae first described by Francis Walker in 1862. It is found on Borneo.

References

Moths described in 1862
Lithosiini